Historia i fantastyka (lit. The History and The Fantasy) is a book-length interview of Polish fantasy writer Andrzej Sapkowski conducted and published in book format by Stanisław Bereś in 2005.

The book has been compared to a prior book-length interview Bereś carried out with Polish science fiction writer Stanisław Lem in the 1980s (expanded 2002 edition: Thus Spoke... Lem, Polish title Tako rzecze... Lem). Wojciech Orliński in his review of Historia i fantastyka notes that it allows a comparison on how Polish science fiction and fantasy has changed over those two decades.

In the book, Sapkowski and Bereś  discuss not only Sapkowski's works and inspirations, but his views on politics, military and pacifism, religion and society,  relations of history and fantasy, as well as Sapkowski's views on literature.

References

Further reading
 Agnieszka Kołodyńska, Książkę zrodził przypadek: Profesor Stanisław Bereś o wywiadzie z Andrzejem Sapkowskim, Gazeta Wyborcza Opole nr 277, 2005-11-29 

2005 non-fiction books
Andrzej Sapkowski
Books of interviews
Polish non-fiction books